At-Bashy is a district of Naryn Region in Kyrgyzstan. The administrative center is at At-Bashy. The mountain lake Chatyr-Kul lies in the southwestern part of the district.

Population

Rural communities and villages
In total, At-Bashy District includes 19 settlements in 11 rural communities. Each rural community includes one or several villages. The rural communities and settlements in the At-Bashy District are as follows:

 Acha-Kayyngdy (seat: Acha-Kayyngdy)
 Ak-Jar (seat: Ak-Jar)
 Ak-Moyun (seat: Ak-Moyun; incl. Birdik)
 Ak-Muz (seat: Ak-Muz)
 Ak-Talaa (seat: Kalinin; incl. Terek-Suu)
 At-Bashy (seat: At-Bashy)
 Bash-Kayyngdy (seat: Bash-Kayyngdy; incl. Bolshevik)
 Kara-Koyun (seat: Kyzyl-Tuu; incl. Kara-Bulung)
 Kara-Suu (seat: Kara-Suu; incl. Dyykan)
 Kazybek (seat: Kazybek; incl. Jangy-Küch)
 Taldy-Suu (seat: Taldy-Suu; incl. Özgörüsh and Birinchi May)

See also
 Karool-Tebe
 Kök-Aygyr
 Tash Rabat

References 

Districts of Naryn Region